is a passenger railway station  located in the city of Nishinomiya, Hyōgo Prefecture, Japan. It is operated by the West Japan Railway Company (JR West).

Lines

Station layout
The station has two side platforms serving two tracks, connected to the one-story concrete station building by an underground passage. The station has a "Midori no Madoguchi" staffed ticket office.

Platforms

Adjacent stations

History
The station opened on 8 June 1898, originally named . It was renamed Namaze Station on 25 March 1899. With the privatization of Japanese National Railways (JNR) on 1 April 1987, the station came under the control of JR West.

Station numbering was introduced in March 2018 with Namaze being assigned station number JR-G57.

Passenger statistics
In fiscal 2016, the station was used by an average of 1867 passengers daily

Surrounding area
 
Hokusetsu Central Hospital

See also
 List of railway stations in Japan

References

External links

  

Railway stations in Hyōgo Prefecture
Railway stations in Japan opened in 1898
Stations of West Japan Railway Company
Nishinomiya